Bloomin Mud Shuffle is an American independent comedy film written and directed by Frank V. Ross. The film stars James Ransone, Natasha Lyonne, Sean Bradley, Tim Baker, and Tim Baltz. The film had its world premiere at the Wisconsin Film Festival on April 10, 2015.

Premise
Lonnie's life hasn't changed much since he's graduated high school. He still drinks way too much, he still even paints houses, and still hangs out with his old friends from high school.

Cast
 James Ransone as Lonnie
 Alexia Rasmussen as Monica
 Natasha Lyonne as Jock
 Alex Karpovsky as Chuck
Joe Swanberg as Brock
Sean Bradley as Mike
 Tim Baker as Ernie
 Tim Baltz as Bobby

Release
The film had its world premiere at the Wisconsin Film Festival on April 10, 2015. The film went on to screen at Rooftop Films on July 10, 2015. The film is scheduled to screen at the Sidewalk Film Festival on August 30, 2015.

References

External links
 
 

2015 films
2015 comedy films
American independent films
2015 independent films
2010s English-language films
2010s American films